Shuozhou is a prefecture-level city in northern Shanxi province, China, bordering Inner Mongolia to the northwest. It is situated along the upper reaches of the Fen River.

History

The site of Shuozhou was the ancient Chinese frontier town of Mayi (马邑), which was used as a trading post between China and the Xiongnu nomads of the eastern Eurasian steppe.

In 201BC, the founder of the Han dynasty Liu Bang (posthumously known as Emperor Gaozu or the "High Ancestor") moved Han Xin from his fief around Yuzhou in Henan to Mayi, where he was attacked by the Xiongnu. Finding himself distrusted by the Han emperor, Han Xin allied with the Xiongnu instead and joined them on their raids against China until his death in battle in 196BC. Mayi was subsequently the capital of Dai Prefecture and the scene of an attempted ambush of the Xiongnu by Chinese troops in 133BC.

During the chaos between the fall of the Sui and rise of the Tang, Mayi was the base of the would-be emperor Liu Wuzhou.

Administrative divisions
The seat of government is in Shuocheng District, the urban core of the city.

Climate
Shuozhou has a continental, monsoon-influenced semi-arid climate (Köppen BSk), with cold, very dry, and somewhat long winters, and warm, somewhat humid summers. Typifying the influence of the East Asian Monsoon, over three-fourths of the annual  of precipitation occurs from June to September.

Economy
It is a centre of industry, and its notable industries are primarily mining of coal and other ores such as iron, bauxite, mica, manganese, and graphite.  Other economic sectors include agriculture, chemical industry, ceramics, and fishing.

Education
North University of China at Shuozhou (中北大学朔州校区)  http://neuc.nuc.edu.cn/
Shanxi College of Technology (山西工学院)  http://www.sxct.edu.cn/

Tourism
Western tourists rarely come to this area of China, but there are some attractions. The Yingxian Tower, built in 1056 during the Liao Dynasty, is one of the main sites of the region. It was built entirely of wood, without using nails, and serves as a museum of calligraphy. There are also some paleolithic ruins, and ancient gravesites from the Dongyi people.

Transportation
The Dayun Expressway (Datong—Yuncheng) passes through it, and it has 5 specialized train lines.

Notable people
 George F. Gao, virologist and immunologist.

References

External links
Official website 

 
Cities in Shanxi
Prefecture-level divisions of Shanxi